The 2013–14 Indian Federation Cup was the 35th edition of the Federation Cup, the main domestic cup competition in Indian football. A total of 16 teams played in this edition of the tournament in which they all entered in the group stage consisting of four groups of four teams each.

The defending champions were East Bengal, who beat Dempo 3–2 in the 2012 final.

The final was played on 25 January 2014 at the Jawaharlal Nehru Stadium in Kochi, Kerala between Churchill Brothers and Sporting Goa, with Churchill Brothers winning 3–1.

Teams
This edition of the Federation Cup saw 16 teams taking part in the tournament, 13 of which came from the ongoing I-League with the other three coming from the I-League 2nd Division. Originally, the three 2nd Division teams to take part in the tournament were to be Bhawanipore, Langsning, and United Sikkim, however, Langning withdrew. As a replacement, Eagles were allowed to enter the tournament for fulfilling the AFC Criteria and also to add a local team from Kerala into the tournament.

Venues
The venues for the Federation Cup were announced in 2013, with the Jawaharlal Nehru Stadium and the MDS Complex being chosen to host matches. The Jawaharlal Nehru Stadium hosted matches for Group A and C while the MDS Complex hosted Group B and D matches. The semi-finals and final took place at the Jawaharlal Nehru Stadium.

Group stage

Group A

Group B

Group C

Group D

Semi-finals

Final

Goalscorers
4 goals:

 Balwant Singh (Churchill Brothers)
 Cornell Glen (Shillong Lajong)
 Koko Sakibo (Eagles)
 Victorino Fernandes (Sporting Goa)
 Odafe Onyeka Okolie (Mohun Bagan)

3 goals:

 Abdelhamid Shabana (Churchill Brothers)
 Christopher Chizoba (Mohun Bagan)
 Anthony Wolfe (Churchill Brothers)
 Boima Karpeh (Sporting Goa)
 Tolgay Özbey (Dempo)

2 goals:

 Beikhokhei Beingaichho (Bengaluru FC)
 Chidi Edeh (East Bengal)
 Beevan D'Mello (Sporting Goa)
 Robin Singh (Bengaluru FC)
 Josimar (Mohammedan)
 Roberto Mendes Silva (Dempo)
 Arturo Navarro (Sporting Goa)

1 goal:

 Sunil Chhetri (Bengaluru FC)
 Alesh Sawant (Churchill Brothers)
 Dipendu Dowary (Bhawanipore)
 Zohib Islam Amiri (Dempo)
 Rakesh Masih (Mohammedan)
 Penn Orji (Mohammedan)
 Pappachen Pradeep (Mumbai)
 Lamine Tamba (Rangdajied United)
 Matthew Foschini (Salgaocar)
 Seikhohau Tuboi (Shillong Lajong)
 Ranti Martins (United)
 Thoi Singh (Bengaluru FC)
 Lenny Rodrigues (Churchill Brothers)
 Ryuji Sueoka (East Bengal)
 Katsumi Yusa (Mohun Bagan)
 Riga Mustapha (Pune)
 Bikash Jairu (Salgaocar)
 Boithang Haokip (Shillong Lajong)
 Taisuke Matsugae (Shillong Lajong)
 Oluwaunmi Somide (United Sikkim)
 Daniel Bedemi (Bhawanipore)
 George Alwyn (Dempo)
 James Moga (East Bengal)
 Ujjal Howladar (Mohan Bagan)
 Kim Seng-Yong (Rangdajied United)
 Gilbert Oliveira (Salgaocar)
 Redeem Tlang (Shillong Lajong)
 Baldeep Singh (United)

See also
 Federation Cup
 I-League

References

External links
 Federation Cup on the All India Football Federation website 

 
2012-13
India
Federation Cup